Andréa Mbuyi-Mutombo (born 7 June 1990, in Brussels) is a Congolese football player of Belgian descent who is a free agent.

Career
Mbuyi-Mutombo began his career in the youth from Anderlecht, then in 2006 joined FC Brussels. After one year at Strombeek he was scouted and signed for Portsmouth. Mbuyi was sent on loan from Portsmouth to feeder club Zulte Waregem on 22 August 2008. He scored on his debut for Waregem, scoring in the 89th minute against Mechelen, just minutes after being substituted into the game. He scored yet again in his next match against Tubize. After only six months, the Congolese midfielder returned to Portsmouth from Zulte Waregem, where he played 14 games and scored three goals. Mutombo was supposed to stay in Belgium on loan until June, but the Belgian club officials were not happy with his attitude.

Following his release, he underwent trials at Dutch Eredivisie side NEC. He was linked with moves to Genoa, Sporting Lisbon and Sporting Braga. On 19 June 2009, the 18-year-old attacking midfielder joined Standard Liège on a two-year deal.

On 11 December 2011, Mbuyi-Mutombo moved to Cercle Brugge on a one-year deal.  After spells with Rijeka, Istra and Fréjus Saint-Raphaël, he signed a one-year deal with Scottish club Inverness Caledonian Thistle on 30 July 2015. He scored his first goal for Inverness in a 2–0 Scottish Cup win over Stirling Albion on 19 January 2016.
Mutombo returned to Scotland in August 2018 signing a one-year deal with Partick Thistle. Mutombo left Thistle in January 2019 having scored 3 goals in all competitions.

International
He was a youth international for Belgium, at under-19 level.

In 2011, he made his debut for the DR Congo national team.

References

External links
 

Living people
1990 births
Footballers from Brussels
Belgian footballers
Democratic Republic of the Congo footballers
Democratic Republic of the Congo international footballers
R.S.C. Anderlecht players
Association football midfielders
Belgian people of Democratic Republic of the Congo descent
R.W.D.M. Brussels F.C. players
Portsmouth F.C. players
S.V. Zulte Waregem players
Standard Liège players
Sint-Truidense V.V. players
Cercle Brugge K.S.V. players
Belgian Pro League players
HNK Rijeka players
NK Istra 1961 players
RNK Split players
Inverness Caledonian Thistle F.C. players
Scottish Professional Football League players
Croatian Football League players
Expatriate footballers in England
Expatriate footballers in Scotland
Expatriate footballers in Croatia
Partick Thistle F.C. players
FC Stade Lausanne Ouchy players